Lucie Hradecká and Anabel Medina Garrigues were the defending champions, but Garrigues chose to participate in the 2011 Internazionali Femminili di Palermo.

Hradecká has partnered up with Eva Birnerová and won the tournament, beating Jarmila Gajdošová and Julia Görges in the final, 4–6, 6–2, [12–10]. This was the fifth straight time that Hradecká won the event in doubles, having won every time since the event's creation in 2007.

Seeds

  Natalie Grandin /  Vladimíra Uhlířová (first round)
  Olga Govortsova /  Alla Kudryavtseva (quarterfinals,withdrew due to Kudryavtseva's toothache)
  Nuria Llagostera Vives /  Arantxa Parra Santonja (quarterfinals,withdrew due to Llagostera Vives's right shoulder injury)
  Klaudia Jans /  Alicja Rosolska (quarterfinals)

Draw

Draw

References
 Main Draw

Gastein Ladies - Doubles
2011 Doubles
Gast
Gast